Maupasinidae is a family of nematodes belonging to the order Ascaridida.

Genera:
 Maupasina Seurat, 1913

References

Nematodes